Ormara Airport  is a domestic airport, located at Ormara, Balochistan, Pakistan.

See also 
 List of airports in Pakistan

References

Airports in Balochistan, Pakistan
Ormara